This is the results breakdown of the local elections held in the Basque Country on 3 April 1979. The following tables show detailed results in the autonomous community's most populous municipalities, sorted alphabetically.

Overall

City control
The following table lists party control in the most populous municipalities, including provincial capitals (shown in bold).

Municipalities

Baracaldo
Population: 122,540

Basauri
Population: 53,946

Bilbao
Population: 450,661

Guecho
Population: 63,926

Irún
Population: 53,921

Portugalete
Population: 56,501

Rentería
Population: 48,586

San Sebastián
Population: 174,818

Santurce Antiguo
Population: 54,470

Vitoria
Population: 181,216

Juntas Generales

References

Basque Country
1979